The Last Jew is a 2000 novel by Noah Gordon. It is about the Jews in 15th-century Spain, in the time of the Inquisition, when they were  expelled. It tells the story of the life of a Jewish boy named Yonah Toledano. He is the last of his line of renowned Jewish artists and bankers.

Plot summary
The year is 1492 and Spain is in the grip of the Inquisition. The Church has sponsored anti-Jewish sentiment in the populace, culminating in the expulsion by royal edict of the entire Jewish community from their homes of many generations. Those that have not converted are forced to leave.

However, 15-year-old Yonah Toledano has been left behind. He has lost family members to the troubles, both his father, a celebrated Spanish silversmith, and his brother. On a donkey named Moise, he journeys, remaining a Jew, growing to manhood across Spain to escape his fate.

Literary significance and reception
Many critics have reviewed the book and their comments have often been positive. 
"This is an excellent, abundant tapestry of a historical novel that will keep readers on the edges of their seats." — The Providence Journal
 
"Consistently superb ... The new novel showcases Gordon's strength as a writer of provocative historical fiction."  — The San Francisco Chronicle
 
"[Noah Gordon] illuminates the choices history forces on individuals—and, not incidentally, creates a grand, informative adventure and a completely engaging, unsentimental portrait of a turbulent time." — Publishers Weekly
 
"Gordon is a natural storyteller, and, given the novel's fascinating setting and a more-than-likeable hero, this superior historical novel should have a place in all libraries." — Library Journal

Awards and nominations
Que Leer Prize winner (Spain)
Boccaccio Literary Prize winner (Italy)

Footnotes

References

2000 American novels
American historical novels
Novels set in Spain
Fiction set in 1492
Novels set in the 1490s
Reconquista in fiction